The Antagonists is an American legal drama television series that aired on CBS from March 26 until May 30, 1991.

Premise
Two Los Angeles lawyers clash inside and outside of the courtroom. Hal Erickson, in his book, Encyclopedia of Television Law Shows: Factual and Fictional Series About Judges, Lawyers and the Courtroom, 1948-2008, commented: "The hour-long CBS drama series The Antagonists was a potpourri of timeworn legal-show cliches ..."

Cast
David Andrews as Jack Scarlett
Lauren Holly as Kate Ward
Lisa Jane Persky as Joanie Rutledge
Brent Jennings as ADA Marvin Thompson
Matt Roth as Clark Munsinger

Episodes

References

External links
 

1991 American television series debuts
1991 American television series endings
1990s American drama television series
1990s American legal television series
English-language television shows
CBS original programming
Television series by Universal Television
Television shows set in Los Angeles